Yang Zi (杨子; born 1963) is a Chinese poet and translator.

Life
Yang was born in Anhui, and lived in Xinjiang. He co-founded the literary journal, Big Bird (大鸟).

Since 1993, he lives in Guangzhou, and is Associate Chief Editor of the Nanfang People Weekly.

He has translated Osip Mandelstam, Paul Celan, Fernando Pessoa, Gary Snyder and Charles Simic into Chinese.

Works
Border Fast Train, 1994
灰眼睛 (Gray Eyes), 2000
胭脂 (Rouge), 海风出版社, 2007

Works in English
"Rouge", Cerise Press, fall winter 2010/2011
"Desolation", Cerise Press, fall winter 2010/2011
"From a Comet"; "Salt Sprinkled on the Tongue of the Mute"; "Night Rain"; "Dark Slope"; "At Night, So Many People", Conjunctions,
"Pearl River" PN Review 199, Volume 37 Number 5, May–June 2011.
"Yang Zi: White Cloud & Black Face & Father", The Offending Adam

References

People's Republic of China poets
1963 births
Poets from Anhui
People's Republic of China translators
French–Chinese translators
English–Chinese translators
Living people
20th-century Chinese translators
21st-century Chinese translators